Filatima tephritidella is a moth of the family Gelechiidae. It is found in France, Austria, Slovakia, Italy, Hungary, Romania, Poland, North Macedonia, Ukraine and Russia.

References

Moths described in 1844
Filatima